Rinat Takhirovich Mavletdinov (born 9 September 1988) is a former Russian professional football player.

Club career
He played 5 seasons in the Russian Football National League for 4 different clubs.

External links
 

1988 births
Footballers from Moscow
Living people
Russian footballers
FC Khimki players
FC Nizhny Novgorod (2007) players
FC Fakel Voronezh players
FC Luch Vladivostok players
FC Saturn Ramenskoye players
Association football midfielders
FC Volga Nizhny Novgorod players
FC Sportakademklub Moscow players
FC Mashuk-KMV Pyatigorsk players